Tom Campbell (born 2 November 1991) is a professional Australian rules footballer currently playing for the St Kilda Football Club. Campbell previously played for the Western Bulldogs and North Melbourne Football Clubs in the Australian Football League (AFL). He was recruited by the club in the 2012 Rookie Draft, with pick #27. Campbell made his debut in Round 13, 2012, against  at Docklands, having been promoted to the senior list to replace the suspended ruckman Will Minson. After being delisted by the Bulldogs at the conclusion of the 2018 AFL season, Campbell joined  as a rookie in the AFL's new supplemental selection period (SSP). Campbell reached his 50th AFL game during the 2021 season, where he was lauded by his teammates and coaches for his leadership and guidance while playing tandem in the ruck with Todd Goldstein. He made his St Kilda debut against Port Adelaide at Cazalys stadium, Cairns during round 7 of the 2022 season.

Campbell is an advocate for greater action to combat climate change and outside football is involved in several climate change projects. Along with Jasper Pittard, Campbell launched the AFL Players for Climate action initiative in 2021.

References

External links

1991 births
Living people
Western Bulldogs players
Bendigo Football Club players
Australian rules footballers from Victoria (Australia)
North Melbourne Football Club players
Williamstown Football Club players